Oswald Charles Dawson  (1 September 1919 – 22 December 2008) was a South African cricketer who played in 9 Test matches, all against England, in the 1947 and 1948–49 series.

He was a medium pace bowler and a useful late middle order batsman who was an important player for Natal from 1938–39 to 1949–50 and Border from 1951–52 to 1961–62. He also played baseball for Natal. His brother Denis played cricket for Kenya and East Africa.

Before he came to prominence on the cricket field, he had a distinguished record in World War II. He served with the Royal Durban Light Infantry at the Battle of El Alamein and later won a Military Cross in Italy.

References

External links

1919 births
2008 deaths
South African people of British descent
White South African people
South Africa Test cricketers
South African cricketers
Border cricketers
KwaZulu-Natal cricketers
Recipients of the Military Cross
South African military personnel of World War II
South African Army officers
South African recipients of British honours